Ann Nesby (born Lula Ann Bennett; July 24, 1955) is an American R&B, gospel and dance music singer and actress. She is the former lead singer of Sounds of Blackness; a songwriter with credits including hits sung by Patti LaBelle and Gladys Knight; plus she co-starred in the 2003 romance musical The Fighting Temptations with Cuba Gooding Jr. and Beyoncé Knowles.  Nesby had various appearances on the hit television series American Idol and Queen Sugar. In 2000, she duetted with Al Green on "Put It on Paper". Nesby has been nominated four times since her departure from Sounds of Blackness, most recently for her 2007 album This Is Love; plus the lead single "I Apologize" was nominated for a Grammy at the 2008 Grammy Awards.

Career
Nesby joined Sounds of Blackness in the late 1980s. Sounds of Blackness were awarded two Grammys in 1991 and 1993, and Nesby sang on a number of their tracks including "I Believe," "Optimistic," "I'm Going All the Way," "Soul Holiday," and "The Pressure."

In 1996, Nesby released her debut solo album, I'm Here for You. In the UK, her Witness EP peaked at #42 on the UK Singles Chart in December 1996, and Hold On EP at #75 in 1997.

Tyler Perry cast Nesby in a lead role in his 1998-2000 stage production, I Know I've Been Changed.  By 2002, Nesby released her second album, Put It on Paper.  The lead single of the same title featured Al Green, leading Nesby to her first solo Grammy nomination in 2003, and the album included Nesby's first #1 song on the dance chart, "Lovin' Is Really My Game", a cover version of the 1977 hit dance tune by Brainstorm.

She appeared in the 2003 film, The Fighting Temptations. Nesby subsequently garnered three additional Grammy nominations between 2004 and 2008.

Her latest album, The Lula Lee Project debuted at #13 on the US Billboards Top Gospel Album Chart and #57 on the R&B chart. Nesby's latest nominations include Best R&B Performance By a Duo or Group with Vocal for her duet with Calvin Richardson, "Love Has Finally Come at Last" and Best Traditional R&B Vocal Performance for "Sow Love".

Discography
Albums

Other contributions

See also
 List of number-one dance hits (United States)
 List of artists who reached number one on the US Dance chart

References

External links
 Official website
 

American house musicians
American film actresses
American gospel singers
American dance musicians
Living people
Universal Records artists
Grammy Award winners
Musicians from Joliet, Illinois
1952 births
Actresses from Illinois
Actors from Joliet, Illinois
American contemporary R&B singers
20th-century African-American women singers
21st-century African-American women singers